The Williams House is a historic house in Fort Lauderdale, Florida. It is located at 119 Rose Drive. On 28 September 2005, it was added to the U.S. National Register of Historic Places. The two-story masonry building was constructed circa 1926 in the Mediterranean Revival architectural style. The exterior is smooth stucco over concrete block. The roof brackets, gable vents and decorative cartouches are made of cast concrete. The building has an irregular footprint and an asymmetrical façade and sits on a  property.

References

External links

National Register of Historic Places in Broward County, Florida
Houses on the National Register of Historic Places in Florida
Houses in Fort Lauderdale, Florida